Charles John Borland Smith is an American film, stage and television actor. He was born in Minneapolis.

Broadway
A Streetcar Named Desire as Harold Mitchell/Stanley Kowalski (April–July 2005)
Twelve Angry Men as Juror #6 (National tour, September–May 2006/07; September–May 2007/08)
A Man for All Seasons as Jailor (October–December 2008)
Le Père (The Father) as Man (March–June 2016)

Off-Broadway
Twelfth Night as Antonio (Delacorte Theater, Shakespeare in the Park, The Public Theater, June–July 2009)
Spirit Control (by Beau Willimon) as FAA Official/Bill (Manhattan Theatre Club, October–December 2010)

Selected filmography
Into the Fire (2005), as Wilcox
Premium Rush (2012), as Campus Guard
The Happy House (2013), as Desmond
The Cobbler (2014), as Driver

TV appearances

External links

Male actors from Minneapolis
American male film actors
American male stage actors
Place of birth missing (living people)
American male television actors
Living people
Year of birth missing (living people)